Woodside station may refer to:

United Kingdom
Woodside (Aberdeen) railway station, a closed station in Aberdeen, on the Great North of Scotland Railway 

Woodside railway station (London), a closed station on the Woodside and South Croydon Joint Railway 
Woodside Park tube station, a station on the Northern line, north London
Birkenhead Woodside railway station, a closed station on the Birkenhead Railway
Horsforth Woodside railway station, a proposed station on the Harrogate Line
Tumby Woodside railway station, a closed station on the Great Northern Railway
Woodside and Burrelton railway station, a closed station on the Caledonian Railway

United States
61st Street–Woodside (IRT Flushing Line), a station on the New York City Subway
Woodside station (LIRR), a station on the Long Island Rail Road in New York
Woodside station (Maryland), a proposed station on the Purple Line in Maryland

Elsewhere
Woodside railway station, Victoria, a closed station on the Woodside line in Australia
Woodside railway station, Wellington Region, on the Wairarapa Line in New Zealand

See also
Woodside tram stop, a tram stop on the Tramlink system in south London, England